Foster Township may refer to:

 Foster Township, Randolph County, Arkansas, in Randolph County, Arkansas
 Foster Township, Madison County, Illinois
 Foster Township, Marion County, Illinois 
 Foster Township, Michigan  
 Foster Township, Big Stone County, Minnesota
 Foster Township, Faribault County, Minnesota
 Foster Township, Luzerne County, Pennsylvania
 Foster Township, McKean County, Pennsylvania
 Foster Township, Schuylkill County, Pennsylvania
 Foster Township, Beadle County, South Dakota, in Beadle County, South Dakota
 Foster Township, Hutchinson County, South Dakota, in Hutchinson County, South Dakota
 Foster Township, Perkins County, South Dakota, in Perkins County, South Dakota

Township name disambiguation pages